Keith Anderson Benson Jr. (born August 13, 1988) is an American professional basketball player for the Taichung Suns of the T1 League. He played college basketball for Oakland University. A 6-foot-11 center, Benson was a second-round pick (48th overall) in the 2011 NBA draft, selected by the Atlanta Hawks. He has since played in Italy, Philippines, Belarus, China, Lithuania, Estonia and the NBA Development League.

High school career
Born in Cleveland, Ohio and raised in Farmington Hills, Michigan, Benson attended Detroit Country Day School in Beverly Hills, Michigan. On the Detroit Country Day basketball team, Benson averaged only 6.9 points and 4.5 rebounds per game as a senior. Benson initially committed to Fairfield, but changed his mind after a coaching change and committed to Oakland after they offered him a scholarship.

College career
After redshirting his first year at Oakland, Benson became a starter for the 2007–08 season.  Benson started 20 of the team's 29 games and averaged 5.2 points and 3.5 rebounds.  He finished the season with 40 blocks—one shy of Oakland's single-season record. However, he was benched prior to the conference tournament because OU's head coach, Greg Kampe, felt Benson was not playing good enough defense.

At the conclusion of his redshirt junior season, Benson received the Lou Henson Award, given to the "mid-major player of the year". Benson was also named the Summit League Player of the Year. Benson declared himself eligible for the 2010 NBA draft, but withdrew himself after he was unable to work out with NBA teams due to an injured right thumb.

Benson earned a Bachelor of Integrative Studies degree with a minor in art history from Oakland in August 2010, prior to his redshirt senior season. During his senior season in 2010–11, Benson enrolled in master's-level architecture courses in Oakland. In basketball, he set the Summit League's record for career blocks. He broke the record of 317, set by Keith Closs of Central Connecticut State University from 1994–96. Benson was named the Summit League's Player of the Year for the second consecutive season in 2011.

Professional career

2011–12 season
After being projected as a late-second round pick, Benson was selected with the 48th overall pick in the 2011 NBA draft by the Atlanta Hawks, becoming the first player from Oakland University selected in the NBA draft. After playing in Italy for Dinamo Basket Sassari during the NBA lockout, he joined the Hawks for preseason in December 2011. After being waived by the Hawks, he joined the Sioux Falls Skyforce of the NBA Development League in January 2012. On March 24, he signed a 10-day contract with the Golden State Warriors. He appeared in three games for the Warriors.

2012–13 season
After spending preseason with the Atlanta Hawks, Benson was acquired by the Erie BayHawks of the NBA D-League for the 2012–13 season. In January 2013, he moved to the Philippines to play for the Talk 'N Text Tropang Texters during the 2013 PBA Commissioner's Cup. He returned to the BayHawks in March 2013.

2013–14 season
Benson spent the 2013–14 season in Belarus with Tsmoki-Minsk. In May 2014, he joined the Shaanxi Wolves in the Chinese NBL.

2014–15 season
After initially signing with Turkish team Banvit, Benson spent the first half of the 2014–15 season in Lithuania with Neptūnas. In February 2015, he left Neptūnas and signed with Estonian team BC Kalev/Cramo.

2015–16 season
After spending preseason with the Miami Heat, Benson joined the Sioux Falls Skyforce for the 2015–16 season. In February 2016, he played in the NBA D-League All-Star Game. He helped the Skyforce finish with a league-best 40–10 record in 2015–16, and went on to help the team win the NBA D-League championship with a 2–1 Finals series win over the Los Angeles D-Fenders.

2016–17 season
After spending a second straight preseason with the Miami Heat, Benson once again played for the Sioux Falls Skyforce during the 2016–17 season.

2017–18 season
In August and September 2017, Benson had a two-game stint with Guizhou in the Chinese NBL. He then began the 2017–18 season in Greece with Aris Thessaloniki, before joining Japanese team Osaka Evessa in January 2018.

2018–19 season
Benson's 2018–19 season was spent in Germany with Eisbären Bremerhaven.

2019–20 season
On August 1, 2019, Benson signed with the South East Melbourne Phoenix in Australia for the 2019–20 NBL season. He parted ways with the Phoenix on January 4, 2020. Days later, he signed with Shabab Al Ahli of the UAE National Basketball League.

2020–21 season
On December 17, 2020, he signed with Rytas of the LKL.

2021–22 season
On May 25, 2022, Keith Benson was drafted thirteenth overall by Enemies with their second round pick of the 2022 BIG3 draft.

2022–23 season
On March 8, 2023, Taichung Suns registered Benson as import player. On March 9, Benson signed with the Taichung Suns of the T1 League.

Career statistics

College

|-
| style="text-align:left;"| 2007–08
| style="text-align:left;"| Oakland
| 29 || 20 || 13.4 || .505 || .000 || .667 || 3.5 || .1 || .2 || 1.4 || 5.2
|-
| style="text-align:left;"| 2008–09
| style="text-align:left;"| Oakland
| 36 || 36 || 27.8 || .622 || .000 || .667 || 7.8 || .7 || .6 || 2.4 || 14.3
|-
| style="text-align:left;"| 2009–10
| style="text-align:left;"| Oakland
| 35 || 35 || 31.3 || .533 || .400 || .724 || 10.5 || .8 || .4 || 3.3 || 17.3
|-
| style="text-align:left;"| 2010–11
| style="text-align:left;"| Oakland
| 35 || 35 || 32.4 || .547 || .391 || .643 || 10.1 || 1.1 || .8 || 3.6 || 17.9
|-

NBA

Regular season

|-
| style="text-align:left;"| 
| style="text-align:left;"| Golden State
| 3 || 0 || 3.0 || .000 || .000 || .000 || 1.0 || .0 || .0 || .0 || .0
|-
| align="center" colspan="2" | Career
| 3 || 0 || 3.0 || .000 || .000 || .000 || 1.0 || .0 || .0 || .0 || .0

Personal
Benson's mother Janice Ellen Hale is a professor of early childhood education at Wayne State University and founding director of the Institute for the Study of the African American Child at Wayne State.

References

External links
 Oakland bio
 Legabasket.it profile
 NBA D-League profile
 PBA-online.net profile

1988 births
Living people
American expatriate basketball people in Australia
American expatriate basketball people in Belarus
American expatriate basketball people in Estonia
American expatriate basketball people in Germany
American expatriate basketball people in Greece
American expatriate basketball people in Italy
American expatriate basketball people in Japan
American expatriate basketball people in Lithuania
American expatriate basketball people in the Philippines
American men's basketball players
Aris B.C. players
Atlanta Hawks draft picks
Basketball players from Michigan
Basketball players from Cleveland
BC Kalev/Cramo players
BC Neptūnas players
BC Tsmoki-Minsk players
Centers (basketball)
Detroit Country Day School alumni
Dinamo Sassari players
Eisbären Bremerhaven players
Erie BayHawks (2008–2017) players
Kaohsiung Steelers players
Golden State Warriors players
Oakland Golden Grizzlies men's basketball players
Osaka Evessa players
People from Farmington Hills, Michigan
Philippine Basketball Association imports
Power forwards (basketball)
Sioux Falls Skyforce players
South East Melbourne Phoenix players
TNT Tropang Giga players
American expatriate basketball people in Taiwan
P. League+ imports
Taichung Suns players
T1 League imports